Don Dockstader (born February 13, 1958) is a Republican member of the Wyoming Senate, representing the 16th district since 2009. Previously he served in the House from 2007 to 2008.
He also served as the President of the Wyoming State Senate.

Don Dockstader is adamantly against decriminalizing marijuana. In 2021, he said, "I don't care if 90% of my constituents want it, I'm voting against it, it'll never come to the senate."

Personal life
Dockstader was born in the town of Idaho Falls on the 13th of February, 1958. He has four children and one grandchild. Dockstader is a member of The Church of Jesus Christ of Latter-day Saints.

References

|-

1958 births
21st-century American politicians
Brigham Young University alumni
Latter Day Saints from Wyoming
Living people
Republican Party members of the Wyoming House of Representatives
People from Afton, Wyoming
People from Idaho Falls, Idaho
Republican Party Wyoming state senators